Lillehammer Olympics  may refer to:
1994 Winter Olympics, Winter Olympics celebrated in 1994 in Lillehammer, Norway
2016 Winter Youth Olympics, Youth Winter Olympics celebrated in 2016 in Lillehammer, Norway